John Mann (born June 27, 1985) is an American water polo player. He led the University of California team to the 2006 NCAA Championship, and he played for the United States national team at the 2012 Summer Olympics.

Career

High school
Mann played on the water polo team at Corona del Mar High School and won three C.I.F. titles. Starting his sophomore season, Mann began to rapidly develop as a top youth player in the country and was selected to train with the United States Olympic team shortly after his Sophomore year at Corona del Mar High. Mann attributes his growth during this time to the flexibility of his teachers and administrators allowing him to attend daily practice with the National Team at the Los Alamitos Joint training facility between 7-10 a.m. and 5-9 p.m. practice. Fortunately, Mann was able to balance the responsibilities of both school and sport through this time. Throughout his career at CdM, Mann was named Orange County player of the year multiple times. While at CdM  Mann was a three-time First team All-America and was known for his goals scoring ability both in the center and on the perimeter, as a senior, he scored 109 goals and was named the Orange County Player of the Year despite missing the first month of the season due to an injury sustained in international competition in Russia. M

College
Mann then joined the University of California, Berkeley team. He scored 22 goals as a freshman in 2003. As a sophomore, he led the Bears with 60 goals, was named the team MVP, and was also a first team All-American. The following season, he scored 56 goals to lead the team again. He repeated as team MVP and was again named to the All-America first team.

In 2006, Mann scored a team-leading 80 goals and led California to the NCAA Championship. He was a first team All-American for the third straight year and also won the Peter J. Cutino Award as the nation's best male collegiate water polo player. He finished his college career with 218 goals, the second-most in school history.

International
During his career with U.S., Mann appeared in over 350 Matches. He served as Team Captain between 2013-2015. Water polo captaincy is a rare distinction for a Center player (position) due to the constant physical contact and nature that the position requires. Typically, a perimeter player is earns the title of captain at the elite level. From 2001-2016 Mann represented the United States in; 2 Olympics (London, Rio), 3 Pan- American Games, and appeared in multiple Fina World championship, Fina World Cups, and Fina World League competitions.

Professional
Mann played for 5 professional clubs throughout his Professional career. Esporte Clube Pinhieros(São Paulo, Brazil), C.N. Barceloneta (Barcelona, Spain), R.N. Nervi (Genoa, Italy), V.K. Red Star (Belgrade, Serbia) and C.N. Marseilles (Marseilles, France).

Incredibly, Mann became the League champion, League Cup Champion, and Super Cup Champion of each the Brazilian, Spanish, French, and Serbian Leagues. This success further solidified Mann as one of the most accomplished and sought after U.S. players in the International Professional league system. He represented C.N. Barceloneta (Barcelona, Spain), V.K. Red Star (Belgrade, Serbia) and C.N. Marseilles (Marseilles, France) in Champions League. In 2013, he won the European Super Cup which is a game played between the two best teams in all of the European league systems.

Personal
Mann was born in Beverly Hills, California, on June 27, 1985.  His father played football at Purdue.

References

External links
 

1985 births
Living people
American male water polo players
California Golden Bears men's water polo players
Olympic water polo players of the United States
Water polo players at the 2012 Summer Olympics
Sportspeople from Beverly Hills, California
Pan American Games medalists in water polo
Pan American Games gold medalists for the United States
Water polo players at the 2015 Pan American Games
Medalists at the 2015 Pan American Games